Neo Cali is the seventh studio album by American electronic musician Vektroid, released on October 7, 2011. The album's genre was originally recognized as "DOSWave," a genre created by Vektroid herself to describe her early albums. In the original album description, she wrote: "this is my ode to moody summers transfigured upon pattern diffused lifescapes and brushed off; to fabricated memories of teen hackers of the past and their elementary school computer labs buried deep within the oceans of time. to a new life, experienced more vividly through microsoft encarta and library terminals of the past. we miss you."

Track listing

Notes
 The tracks "Untitled" & "Wild Wave" have both been removed from the album at different times (Untitled more recently) and neither are in the current version.

References

Vektroid albums
2011 albums